Charlie Ntamark (born 22 July 1964) is a Cameeroonian former footballer who played at both professional and international levels as a midfielder.

Career
Ntamark played in Cameroon for Canon Yaoundé, and in England for Boreham Wood, Walsall and Hednesford Town.

He also represented Cameroon at international level, earning 31 caps and appearing on Cameroon's championship team at the 1988 African Cup of Nations.

Later life
After retiring from professional football, Ntamark studied law at the University of Birmingham.

Personal life
His son Charlie Anagho-Ntamark is also a footballer, active in English non-league and in Canada after being released from Aston Villa’s academy aged 16.

References

1964 births
Living people
Cameroonian footballers
Cameroon international footballers
Boreham Wood F.C. players
Walsall F.C. players
Hednesford Town F.C. players
English Football League players
Association football midfielders
Expatriate footballers in England
Cameroonian expatriate footballers
Cameroonian expatriate sportspeople in England
1988 African Cup of Nations players
Africa Cup of Nations-winning players